HSWP may refer to:
Hungarian Socialist Workers' Party
Historical Society of Western Pennsylvania